The European Covered Bond Council (ECBC) is the platform that brings together covered bond market participants including issuers, analysts, investment bankers, rating agencies and a wide range of interested stakeholders.

History

The ECBC was established by the European Mortgage Federation (EMF) in 2004 to represent and promote the interests of covered bond market participants at the international level. The ECBC's main objective is to be the point of reference for matters regarding the covered bond industry and operate as a think-tank, as well as a lobbying and networking platform for covered bond market participants.

The ECBC has over 100 members across over 30 active covered bond jurisdictions. ECBC members represent over 95% of covered bonds outstanding, which were worth nearly 2.5 trillion EUR at the end of 2015.

Structure

The ECBC Plenary meeting is a bi-annual discussion forum where all ECBC members gather around the table to discuss topical industry issues and to establish strong network links.

The Steering Committee, headed by the ECBC Chairman, and composed of representatives from the major covered bond issuing jurisdictions and industry experts, is responsible for the day-to-day activities of the ECBC. The Steering Committee convenes once every quarter and addresses strategy related questions and coordinates the agendas of the various ECBC working groups (see below).

The Secretariat of the ECBC is based in Brussels, Belgium. It coordinates the various ECBC bodies on a day-to-day basis.

Working Groups

 The EU Legislation Working Group has over the past five years been closely following the debate on the Capital Requirements Directive (CRD) and has been successfully lobbying at EU level to obtain treatment that recognises the low risk profile of the instrument. In this respect, the group has drafted and passed comments to the European Institutions.

 The Technical Issues Working Group represents the technical think thank of the covered bond community, drawing on experts from across the industry to tackle key issues for the industry. Recent work includes covered bond analysts and country experts working together to describe the key features of each covered bond jurisdiction, presented in an easy to use, comparable format on line.

 The Market Related Issues Working Group discusses topics such as conventions on trading standards and the market-making process. The Working Group is currently leading the discussions on improving liquidity in secondary markets.

 The Working Group on Statistics and Data is responsible for collecting and publishing complete and up-to-date information on issuing activities and volumes outstanding of covered bonds in all market segments. With 25 different covered bond jurisdictions and numerous issuers, the collection of data is of utmost importance, particularly given that the ECBC data is increasingly viewed as the key source of covered bond statistics.

 The Fact Book Working Group is responsible for the publication of the annual European Covered Bond Fact Book. This publication covers key themes in the industry, market developments, provides a detailed overview of legislative frameworks in different countries as well as statistics. The latest edition of the ECBC Fact Book is available here.

 The Rating Agency Approaches Working Group examines the rating approaches applied by rating agencies and has been active over the past year monitoring, analysing and reacting to the changes underway in covered bond rating methodologies.
 The Global Issues Working Group focuses exclusively on covered bond issues from a global perspective.    Membership of the ECBC continues to grow and its agenda for the coming year is already filled with numerous activities. The ECBC’s objective now is to press ahead in its work with a view to further strengthening its role in facilitating the communication among the different covered bonds stakeholders, working as a catalyst in defining the common features that characterise the asset class and in facilitating improvements in market practices, transparency and liquidity.

Covered Bond Label Foundation

The Covered Bond Label Foundation (CBLF) grants quality labels and is a response to a market-wide request for improved standards and increased transparency in the European covered bond market. The Label was established by the European Covered Bond Council (ECBC) in 2012 and developed by the European issuer community, working in close cooperation with investors and regulators, as well as in consultation with all major stakeholders.

The Covered Bond Label is intended to result in multiple benefits with an enhancement of the overall recognition of and trust in the asset class. The Label facilitates access to relevant and comprehensive information for investors, regulators and other market participants, and demonstrates the determination of the covered bond community to tackle the challenges arising from the crisis. It also underlines the Industry’s active engagement in the maintenance of the high quality of the collateral assets, the improvement of transparency, and eventually, the promotion of liquidity and the strengthening of secondary market activity.

The Covered Bond Label opened for registrations in mid-2012. Following on from an initial test phase run in 2012, the website became fully operational on 1 January 2013, with the first Labels being effective since then. As of January 2017, the Covered Bond Label website features 14 National Transparency Templates, 82 issuer Profiles and information on 98 labelled cover pools across 16 jurisdictions globally. Moreover, the website provides issuance data on close to 4,300 covered bonds, amounting to a total face value of over 1.4 trillion EUR, out of which over 2,000 covered bonds already include information on the Liquidity Coverage Requirement (LCR).

For more information, please visit the Covered Bond Label website: www.coveredbondlabel.com.

External links
 European Covered Bond Council website  
 ECBC Covered Bond Comparative Database, provides detailed descriptions of how each covered bond framework works.
 European Mortgage Federation website
 Covered Bond Label website

International organisations based in Belgium
Finance industry associations
Mortgage